Bom Jesus is a municipality in the state of Piauí in the Northeast region of Brazil.

The municipality contains part of the  Serra das Confusões National Park, created in 1998, which protects an area of the Caatinga biome.

Name
Bom Jesus means "Good Jesus" in Portuguese.

Geography and climate
Bom Jesus has a rather dry tropical savanna climate (Köppen Aw). It received national recognition in November 21, 2005 when it was measured the temperature of 44.7 °C (112.4 °F) in the town, the highest ever officially recorded in Brazil until November 2020.

The municipality contains part of the Uruçui-Una Ecological Station.

See also
List of municipalities in Piauí

References

Municipalities in Piauí